21st Century (known as 21st Century Digital Girl on some online stores) is the third album of the German Eurodance band Groove Coverage, released on July 7, 2006.  It was previously available a few days earlier than expected on the German version of iTunes. Compared to Groove Coverage's previous albums, 7 Years and 50 Days and Covergirl, this album contains much more pop music such as "21st Century Digital Girl", "What You C is What You Get", and a rock song, titled "Rock".

Track listing

Singaporean, Malaysian, China (incl Hong Kong, Macau & Taiwan Edition)

Japanese Edition
The Japanese release by Farm Records includes these 4 additional tracks along with the original track listing.

Chart positions

Singles
"Holy Virgin" (2005)
"On The Radio" (2006)
"21st Century Digital Girl" (June 23, 2006)

Videos
Holy Virgin
On The Radio
21st Century Digital Girl

References

Groove Coverage albums
2006 albums
Universal Records albums